Phidiana lynceus  is a species of sea slug in the genus Phidiana, an aeolidina nudibranch, a marine gastropod mollusc in the family Facelinidae.

Distribution 
The slug is found in the Caribbean and occasionally in Ghana and on the Pacific coast of Panama. It is also recorded off the Canary Islands.

References

  Check List of European Marine Mollusca
 Ortea J.A., Moro L., Bacallado J.J. & Herrera R., 2001 : Catálogo actualizado de los Moluscos Opistobranquios de las Islas Canarias ; Revista de la Academia Canaria de Ciencias 12(3-4): 105-134

Facelinidae
Gastropods described in 1867